The 2 arrondissements of the Guadeloupe department are:
 Arrondissement of Basse-Terre, (prefecture of the Guadeloupe department: Basse-Terre) with 18 communes.  The population of the arrondissement was 189,210 in 2016.
 Arrondissement of Pointe-à-Pitre, (subprefecture: Pointe-à-Pitre) with 14 communes.  The population of the arrondissement was 204,900 in 2016.

History

The arrondissements of Basse-Terre and Pointe-à-Pitre were established in 1947. The arrondissement of Saint-Martin-Saint-Barthélemy, containing the communes of Saint-Martin and Saint-Barthélemy, was created in 1963 from part of the arrondissement of Basse-Terre. This arrondissement was disbanded when Saint-Martin and Saint-Barthélemy became separate overseas collectivities in February 2007.

See also
Cantons of the Guadeloupe department
Communes of the Guadeloupe department

References

Guadeloupe
 
Guadeloupe 1